Petrockstow railway station was a station serving the village of Petrockstowe in West Devon, which is about one mile away. The station was, throughout its passenger-carrying life from 1925 to 1965, spelt without the final "e" of the village name.

The railway was originally built as a narrow-gauge freight line to carry ball clay to Torrington from the Marland and Meeth clay pits. The Torrington and Marland Railway then became the basis of the northern section of the North Devon and Cornwall Junction Light Railway, which opened in 1925 and remained a private line until finally becoming part of the Southern Region of British Railways in 1948.

A victim of Beeching, the line closed to passengers in 1965 but it remained open for freight trains from the Meeth quarries which passed into the rail network through Barnstaple and Torrington until 1982.

In 2014 a small group of local railway enthusiast began clearance work at the Station, clearing the platforms and vegetation. It is hoped to partly restore the Station, in conjunction with the owners, Devon County Council.

References

External links
The Colonel Stephens Society

Disused railway stations in Devon
Former Southern Railway (UK) stations
Railway stations in Great Britain opened in 1925
Railway stations in Great Britain closed in 1965
Beeching closures in England
1925 establishments in England
1965 disestablishments in England
Torridge District